Jayme Amatnecks (Ponta Grossa, December 22, 1966) is a Brazilian composer and conductor.

In 1987 he founded the Children's Choir of UEPG and in 1999 organized the choirs Ars Musica and Vox Pop with which it performed numerous concerts, mainly promoting vocal repertoire of Brazilian music.

He was conductor of the Symphony Orchestra of Ponta Grossa (2002–2005) and from 2005 to 2011 he taught at the University Potiguar – UNP. Directed the Choir of CEIC, the Women's Choir St. Cecilia, the Choir of AFENAB/AABB and the Choir of the Federal Court of Rio Grande do Norte (2005–2011).

He was the originator of draft disclosure of vocal music and choral singing: The implementation of a system through choral music education in public schools in Ponta Grossa, forming 83 choirs, directly reaching 40 regents, 1346 students from public schools in Ponta Grossa and indirectly affecting more than 200,000 people. He lectured and presented concerts in all the capitals of Brazil and served as conductor of Choir Ars Musica, sponsored by the Ministry of Culture of Brazil , Cultural Train that traveled 102 Brazilian cities.

He was twice elected by the class, member of the Conceil of Culture of the city of Ponta Grossa, Paraná.
He composes a free language class and he supported popular music traditions. Since the early 2000s the composer has been dedicated to the production of contemporary avant-garde music for choir, work for which he has been recognized in the international art world.

Amatnecks has a total of six CDs and two awards for artistic merit and the Prize Anita Philipovsky delivered by the city of Ponta Grossa, and the prize The Sower awarded by the Government of the State of Paraná.

Three books published by ARC0 PUBLISHING HOUSE in Curitiba: "CHRISTMAS GLORIA" (2 editions), "TIC, TAC, ZÓIN, A STORY ABOUT THE SOUNDS" and the musical "A GIFT FOR MOM"

In 2013 he served as member of the international jury of the VII Festival Internazionale CHORUS INSIDE in Rome, Italy

It stands out for having proclaimed on behalf of the UN and in Portuguese in Pantheon in Rome , on December 8, 2013 World Day of Choral Singing.

In 2014 he gave a workshop "Mass Santa Cruz, of Osvaldo Lacerda" for singers and conductors of the choirs participating in the X Festival Chorus Inside on the city of Chieti, Italy.

In 2015 the interpretation of the arrangement for the choir of Jayme Amatnecks's of Emiglio Solé's arrangement of the song Duerme Negrito was included in the Spanish short film "Paseo de los melancolicos, 9-3-B-28005-Madrid" of the imminent Spanish director Miguel Trudu, nominated for the Cannes Festival 2017.

Polifonicus Mundi

Polifonicus Mundi is an experimental music, an essay, not a musical work. The Polifonicus is a planimetric composition, i.e., a specific way of ordering structuralist music in which structural units or gestalts replace melody, harmony, strong and weak beats, themes and development. It is the realization of a temporal plane (bottom), taken alone or in relation to others, the survey of sound and musical events. The idea is related to the aesthetics of the relativistic inaccurate and paradoxical.

Duerme NegritoVocal arrangement Emiglio SoléCamerata Ars Musica – Jayme Amatnecks

See also 
Duerme Negrito
Hans-Joachim Koellreutter

Notes

External links
  Article composer in Choral Wiki

1966 births
Brazilian composers
20th-century Brazilian male singers
20th-century Brazilian singers
Latin American folk singers
Latin folk guitarists
Música Popular Brasileira singers
Living people
Brazilian male singer-songwriters
21st-century Brazilian male singers
21st-century Brazilian singers